Delta-aminolevulinate synthase 1 also known as ALAS1 is a protein that in humans is encoded by the ALAS1 gene. ALAS1 is an aminolevulinic acid synthase.

Delta-aminolevulinate synthase catalyzes the condensation of glycine with succinyl-CoA to form delta-aminolevulinic acid. This nuclear-encoded mitochondrial enzyme is the first and rate-limiting enzyme in the mammalian heme biosynthetic pathway. There are 2 tissue-specific isozymes: a housekeeping enzyme encoded by the ALAS1 gene and an erythroid tissue-specific enzyme encoded by ALAS2.

Mice lacking this gene exhibit embryonic embryonic lethality, indicating that ALAS is essential for early embryogenesis.

References

External links

Further reading